James Chen is the name of:

James Chen (actor), Chinese-American actor
Chen Chien-chih, known as James, Taiwanese politician
Chen Tsu-li (born 1932), known as James, Taiwanese basketball player
Zhijian Chen (born 1966), known as James, Chinese-American biochemist